Otto Graf (28 November 1896 – 22 February 1977) was a German actor. He appeared in more than 50 films and television shows between 1935 and 1970.

Partial filmography

 Nacht der Verwandlung (1935) as René Duval
 The Traitor (1936) as Capitain Dressler (uncredited)
 Capers (1937) as Zahnarzt
 Unternehmen Michael (1937) as Capitain Von Grauff
 Die Fledermaus (1937) as Rundfunkreporter
 Urlaub auf Ehrenwort (1938) as Professor Knudsen
 Liebesbriefe aus dem Engadin (1938)
 Pour le Mérite (1938) as the capitain-lieutenant
 Salonwagen E 417 (1939) as Rittmeister Graf Grenzberg
 Robert Koch (1939) as Dr. Friedrich Löffler
 Legion Condor (1939)
 Angelika (1940) as Prof. Fritz v. Deubertz
 Bismarck (1940) as Robert Von Keudell
 Ohm Krüger (1941) as the German foreign minister
 Krach im Vorderhaus (1941) (uncredited)
 Ich klage an (1941) as Prosecutor Engel
 Was geschah in dieser Nacht (1941) as Von Barlay
 The Great King (1942) as Friedrich Wilhelm von Seydlitz
 Andreas Schlüter (1942) as Count Flemming
 Die Entlassung (1942) as Count Eulenburg
 My Wife Theresa (1942) as Dr.Grothe
 Back Then (1943) as Dr. Lugeon
 Die Wirtin zum Weißen Röß'l (1943) as Heinz Marius
 Melody of a Great City (1943) as Dr. Werner
 Um neun kommt Harald (1944) as Staatsanwalt
 Der große Preis (1944) as Verteidiger
 Der Engel mit dem Saitenspiel (1944) as Dr. Thomas Weinzierl
 The Man in the Saddle (1945) as Fritz Thermälen
 Beate (1948) as Dr. Schenk, Rechtsanwalt
 Nur eine Nacht (1950)
 Canaris (1954)
 Devil in Silk (1956) as the chief judge
 Beichtgeheimnis (1956) as Bischof
 The Story of Anastasia (1956) as the Duke of Leuchtenberg
 Different from You and Me (1957) as the chief justice
 The Last Witness (1960) as Dr. Beyer
 The Marriage of Mr. Mississippi (1961) as the minister president
 Der Prozeß Carl von O. (1964) as Ministerialdirektor
 Der junge Lord (1969) as Sir Edgar
 Dr. Fabian: Laughing Is the Best Medicine (1969) as Consul Lürsen
 Gentlemen in White Vests (1970)

References

External links

1896 births
1977 deaths
German male film actors